Jones Town may refer to:

 Jones Town, an area within the city of Kingston, Jamaica
 Jones Town, a settlement in West Grand Bahama

See also:
 Jonestown (disambiguation)